The third season of the American military drama television series SEAL Team premiered on October 2, 2019, and ended on May 6, 2020. Only 20 episodes were produced due to the COVID-19 pandemic in the United States. The season is produced by CBS Television Studios.

Cast and characters

Main 
 David Boreanaz as Master Chief Special Warfare Operator Jason Hayes a.k.a. Bravo 1/1B
 Max Thieriot as Special Warfare Operator Second Class Clay Spenser a.k.a. Bravo 6/6B
 Jessica Paré as Amanda "Mandy" Ellis
 Neil Brown Jr. as Senior Chief Special Warfare Operator Raymond "Ray" Perry, a.k.a. Bravo 2/2B
 A. J. Buckley as Special Warfare Operator First Class Sonny Quinn a.k.a. Bravo 3/3B
 Toni Trucks as Ensign Lisa Davis
 Judd Lormand as Lieutenant Commander Eric Blackburn

Recurring 
 Tyler Grey as Special Warfare Operator First Class Trent Sawyer a.k.a. Bravo 4/4B
 Jusitin Melnick as Special Warfare Operator First Class Brock Reynolds a.k.a. Bravo 5/5B
 Kerri Medders as Emma Hayes
 Parisa Fakhri as Naima Perry
 Ammon Jacob Ford as Michael "Mikey" Hayes
 Alona Tal as Stella Baxter
 Scott Foxx as Senior Chief Special Warfare Operator Scott "Full Metal" Carter a.k.a. Bravo 7/7B
 Lucca De Oliveira as Special Warfare Operator First Class Victor "Vic" Lopez
 Jamie McShane as Captain Grayson Lindell
 Emily Swallow as Dr. Natalie Pierce
 Adelaide Kane as Rebecca Bowen

Guest 
 Tim Chiou as Special Warfare Operator Michael "Thirty Mike" Chen a.k.a. Charlie 2/2C
 Note:

Episodes

Production 
On May 9, 2019, CBS renewed the series for a third season.

On July 10, 2019, it was reported that Jamie McShane and Rudy Dobrev were cast in recurring roles for the third season. On August 7, 2019, Emily Swallow was cast in a recurring capacity for the third season.

Ratings

Home media

References

2019 American television seasons
2020 American television seasons